Sindhi Americans are Americans or residents of the United States who are of Sindhi descent. They are a subgroup of Indian Americans and Pakistani Americans.

Demographics
Originating from the Sindh region of undivided India now in Pakistan,Sindhi Americans belong to either Hindu or Muslim faith. Some belong to the Hindu faith, particularly those who migrated from India. In the 2010 US Census, nearly 7,000 individuals reported Sindhi as their first language. The total population of the Sindhi diaspora in the United States is estimated at over 50,000. The community is spread out over various U.S. cities, with sizable populations on the eastern coast.

Culture
Sindhi festivals such as Cheti Chand are celebrated each year with much fanfare. The American Institute of Sindhulogy (AIS) is a non-profit institute of Sindhology in the U.S., dedicated to researching the history and cultural heritage of Sindh as well as its ancient Indus Valley civilisation.

Organizations and politics
Sindhi Americans are socially and politically active, having formed numerous community and political-oriented organizations. They maintain interest in domestic American politics, as well as Sindhi politics and the wider politics of Pakistan. The Pakistan Peoples Party has a local chapter in the U.S., in which many Sindhis are involved. The World Sindhi Institute is a human rights organization founded in 1997 and is based in Washington, D.C. The World Sindhi Congress (WSC) has a U.S chapter which participates in human rights advocacy and the promotion of Sindhi political interests among the diaspora. G. M. Syed Memorial Committee is a group based in Houston, which promotes the ideology of Sindhi nationalist leader G.M. Syed. There are also Congress-focused lobbying groups such as the Sindhi American Political Action Committee (SAPAC), and the Sindh Monitor. 

In addition, there are multiple community organizations and associations. The Sindhi Association of North America (SANA) is one of the largest societies of Sindhis residing in North America. Other Sindhi associations include the American British Sindhi Medical Network (ABSMN), and the Alliance of Sindhi Associations of Americas which consists of various state-based associations.

Notable people

Indian-origin Sindhi American
 Sabeer Bhatia, entrepreneur and founder of Hotmail
 Dheeraj Sangtiani, Construction Manager 
 Neeraj Khemlani, journalist
 Raj Kiran Mehtani, Bollywood actor
 Rajesh Mirchandani, television journalist
 Rajeev Motwani, computer scientist
 Ramesh Balwani, former president and COO of Theranos
 Reshma Kewalramani, Chief Executive Officer of Vertex Pharmaceuticals
 Sachal Vasandani, jazz singer
 Sanjay Gupta, neurosurgeon and medical journalist 
 Reetika Vazirani, poet and educator
 Umesh Vazirani, computer scientist
 Vijay Vazirani, computer scientist
 Sunita S. Mukhi, performance artist and cultural producer
 Lavina Jadhwani, theatre director and playwright
 Richa Moorjani, actress

Pakistan-origin Sindhi American
 Ali S. Asani, academic
 Abdul-Majid Bhurgri, computer scientist
 Iqbal Theba, actor
 Kumail Nanjiani, actor and stand-up comedian
 Safdar Sarki, political activist
 Gul Agha, computer scientist

See also

 Asian Americans
 Pakistani Americans
 Baloch Americans
 Pashtun Americans
 Punjabi Americans
 Indian Americans

Notes

References

 
Asian-American society
Indian American
Pakistani American
Americans